Itivand-e Jonubi Rural District is a rural district (dehestan) in Kakavand District, Delfan County, Lorestan Province, Iran. At the 2006 census, its population was 6,400, in 1,196 families.  The rural district has 62 villages.

References 

Rural Districts of Lorestan Province
Delfan County